Dorothy Jane (Zander) Seymour Mills (July 5, 1928 – November 17, 2019) was an American baseball author, historian and researcher. She met her future husband Harold Seymour while attending Fenn College, where he was teaching.

In 2010, Oxford University Press credited her as a co-author of the books Baseball: The Early Years, Baseball: The Golden Age, and Baseball: The People's Game, which had all been published under her husband's name.

In 2017, the Society for American Baseball Research created the Dorothy Seymour Mills Lifetime Achievement Award in her name to recognize "any person with a sustained involvement in women's baseball or any woman with a longtime involvement in baseball in any fashion."

Books 
 Baseball: The Early Years (1960), Oxford University Press, with Harold Seymour
 Baseball: The Golden Age (1971), Oxford University Press, with Harold Seymour
 Baseball: The People's Game (1990), Oxford University Press, with Harold Seymour
 A woman's work: writing baseball history with Harold Seymour, McFarland & Company, 
 Chasing baseball: our obsession with its history, numbers, people and places (2010), McFarland & Company, with Richard C. Crepeau
 Drawing card: a baseball novel (2012), McFarland & Company, 
 First mystery: the kiss (2017), BluewaterPress, 
 Second mystery: the wet bathing suit (2017), BluewaterPress, 
 Third mystery: the phone call (2017), BluewaterPress,

References

External links 
Dorothy Seymour Mills Lifetime Achievement Award (Women in Baseball) – Society for American Baseball Research (SABR)

1928 births
2019 deaths
20th-century American historians
20th-century American women writers
21st-century American historians
21st-century American novelists
21st-century American women writers
American women novelists
Baseball writers
Case Western Reserve University alumni
Writers from Cleveland
American women historians
Sports historians
Historians from Ohio